Neptune Frost is a 2021 science fiction romantic musical film co-directed by Saul Williams and Anisia Uzeyman, and starring Cheryl Isheja, Elvis Ngabo and Kaya Free. It follows the relationship between Neptune and Matalusa, coltan miners whose love leads a hacker collective. Ezra Miller serves as a producer, while Lin-Manuel Miranda executive produces.

It had its world premiere at the 2021 Cannes Film Festival in the Directors Fortnight section on July 8, 2021 and was released in the United States on June 3, 2022, by Kino Lorber to critical acclaim. Neptune Frost is the name of a black Revolutionary soldier who served in the Continental Army in 1775.

Plot
The film is an Afrofuturist story set in a village in Burundi made of computer parts, and centers on the relationship between Neptune, an intersex runaway, and Matalusa, a coltan miner, whose love leads a hacker collective.

Cast
 Cheryl Isheja as Neptune
 Elvis Ngabo as Neptune
 Bertrand "Kaya Free" Ninteretse as Matalusa
 Eliane Umuhire as Memory
 Dorcy Rugamba as Innocent
 Rebecca Uwamahoro as Elohel
 Trésor Niyongabo as Psychology 
 Eric Ngangare "1Key" as Potolo 
 Natacha Muziramakenga as Binya
 Cécile Kayirebwa as Nun
  Diogene "Atome" Ntarindwa as Priest

Production
The project was originally conceived by Saul Williams as a graphic novel and stage musical. In 2018, Williams launched a Kickstarter campaign to raise funds, with Lin-Manuel Miranda joining as an executive producer.

In February 2020, it was announced that Ezra Miller and Stephen Hendel were set to produce, with principal photography commencing. Production took place over the course of 27 days in Rwanda.

Release
Neptune Frost had its world premiere on July 8, 2021. at the Directors' Fortnight section at the 2021 Cannes Film Festival, where it was a nominee for the Queer Palm. It had its North American premiere in the Wavelengths program at the 2021 Toronto International Film Festival on September 10, 2021. It also screened at the New York Film Festival on October 2, 2021. and the 2022 Sundance Film Festival on January 21, 2022. It had its Australian premiere at the Melbourne International Film Festival, where it won the Bright Horizons Award.

In December 2021, Kino Lorber acquired distribution rights. It was released in the United States on a limited release on June 3, 2022.

Reception 
 The site's critical consensus reads "Bursting with ideas and ambition, Neptune Frost is difficult to describe -- and just as hard to resist." On Metacritic, the film had a weighted average score of 83 out of 100, based on 20 critics, indicating "universal acclaim."

In November 2022,  the film was nominated for an Independent Spirit Award for Best Cinematography.

See also
List of Afrofuturist films

References

External links

2021 films
2020s musical films
2021 science fiction films
2021 LGBT-related films
American musical films
American science fiction films
American LGBT-related films
Rwandan drama films
Rwandan LGBT-related films
English-language Rwandan films
Afrofuturist films
Science fiction musical films
LGBT-related science fiction films
LGBT-related musical films
Kickstarter-funded films
Films about intersex
2020s American films